Swansea City Association Football Club Under-21s is the most senior team of Swansea City's youth teams and are the club's former reserve team. They compete in the Professional Development League. The Under-21s play the majority of their home fixtures at the club's Youth Academy in Landore, with occasional fixtures taking place at the Swansea.com Stadium.

The Under-21 team is effectively Swansea City's second-string side, but is limited to three outfield players and one goalkeeper over the age of 23 per game following the introduction of new regulations from the 2016–17 season.

Andy Goldie is the manager of the entire Swansea City academy.

Jon Grey and Anthony Wright are in charge of the Under 21s.

Under-23s

Current squad
As of February 2023. Players listed in bold have made an appearance for the first team in a competitive fixture.

Honours
Professional Development League 1 Division 2
Winners:
2016–17

Professional Development League 2
Winners:
2014–15

Premier League Cup
Winners:
2016–17

Timeline

 1912: A team is formed to play in the Welsh Football League.
 1919: A second reserve team is added to the Western League First Division.
 1921: The Western League team is elected into the Southern League Welsh Section.
 1923: The Southern League Welsh Section is renamed the Western Section.
 1925: The reserves leave the Southern League.
 1926: But a second team is restored following election to the London Combination.
 1930: The London Combination is split into two leagues; the Swans were placed in Division 1.
 1933: A single division London Combination is restored.
 1946: Following the War the Combination is renamed the Football Combination and split into two leagues; the Swans were placed in Section B.
 1948: The team is moved into Section A.
 1952: Section A & B are renamed Division 1 and 2, with the Swans placed in the former.
 1955: A single division Football Combination is restored.
 1958: Reverted to two divisions; the Swans were placed in Division 1.
 1960: The Swans are relegated for the first time in the Combination to Division 2.
 1961: Left the Combination after a Saturday and Midweek Section were introduced.
 1964: The top-flight of the Welsh League is renamed the Premier Division.
 1966: The two division system was restored in 1963 and the Swans were back in Division 2 three years later.
 1968: A single division Football Combination is restored.
 1974: The team withdrew from the Combination after the season had started.
 1983: But they were back nine years later to play in a single division league.
 1986: The team decided not to enter a team after the 1985–86 campaign ended.
 1992: Returned to play in Division 2.
 1996: A single division Football Combination is restored.
 1997: The team decided not to enter a team after the 1996–97 campaign ended.
 1999: Returned to play in a five-team Second Division – consisting of Cardiff, Exeter, Plymouth & Torquay.
 2000: The first-team won promotion to Division 2 and the reserve team was withdrawn.
 2003: The regional Wales & West Division was formed and this is where the Swans competed from 2003 up until and including the 2010–11 season.
 2011: Club competed in the Premier Reserve League for the first time. They were placed in the Southern Section.
 2012: Reserve team replaced by an 'Under-21 team' and competed in the inaugural season of the Professional Development League. They were placed in the Professional Development League 2 South.
 2015: Under-21s win the Professional Development League 2 with a 3–2 victory over Huddersfield Town Under-21s.
 2015: Announced that the club will play Professional Development League 1 fixtures at both U21 and U18 level from 2015 to 2016.
 2017: Under-23s win the Professional Development League 1 Division 2 and the Premier League Cup.
 2020: Academy is downgraded to Category Two status, due to financial difficulties.  Thus the under-23s were removed from Premier League 2 Division 2.

League history

Prior to the 2012–13 season, Swansea City's second-string side were a reserve team who had mainly appeared in the Welsh Football League and the English Football Combination. The Reserves also had some short stints in the Western League (1919–21) and the Southern League (1921–25). Following Swansea City's promotion to the Premier League in 2011, Swansea's reserve team were invited to play in the 2011-12 Premier Reserve League. They finished 7th in what would turn out to be their last season as a 'reserve team'.

The historical venue for Swansea City's reserve matches was the Vetch Field. Following the Vetch Field's closure at the end of the 2004–05 season, Swansea City's second string have played at numerous temporary homes. This has included St. Helen's Rugby and Cricket Ground (2005–06), Port Talbot Town F.C.'s Victoria Road (Port Talbot) (2006–09, 2010–11), The Gnoll in Neath (2009–10), Parc y Scarlets in Llanelli (2011–12). Swansea City's home venue for their first season as an Under-21 team was Llanelli A.F.C.'s Stebonheath Park.

Academy
Swansea City Academy is the youth development system of Premier League team Swansea City. It fields an under-18s team in the South Division of the Professional Development League 1 and the FA Youth Cup. The academy also fields an under-19s team in the FAW Welsh Youth Cup.

The team train and play matches at the Youth Academy in Landore, Swansea and at the senior side's training base in Fairwood, Swansea.

Current squad
As of August 2022.

Honours
FAW Welsh Youth Cup
Winners: 12 Times
1999, 2003, 2008, 2010, 2011, 2012, 2013, 2014, 2015, 2016, 2017, 2018, 2019
Runners-up: 6 Times
1990, 1991, 1994, 1996, 2004, 2009

Graduates
The following players have all progressed through the youth academy at Swansea City and have either made at least one appearance for the first team in professional competition, have gone on to play professionally or have represented their national team. Players in bold are still contracted to the club.

2020s

2010s

2000s

References

External links
Under-23 section at club official website
Under-18 section at club official website
Academy section at club official website

Reserves
Football academies in the United Kingdom
1912 establishments in Wales
Premier League International Cup
Professional Development League